An election to Oxfordshire County Council took place on 2 May 2013 as part of the 2013 United Kingdom local elections. 63 councillors were elected from 61 electoral divisions, which returned either one or two county councillors each by first-past-the-post voting for a four-year term of office. Following a boundary review, the electoral divisions were not the same as those used at the previous election in 2009. The election saw the Conservative Party lose overall control of the council as the party found itself one seat short of an overall majority.

All locally registered electors (British, Irish, Commonwealth and European Union citizens) who were aged 18 or over on Thursday 2 May 2013 were entitled to vote in the local elections. Those who were temporarily away from their ordinary address (for example, away working, on holiday, in student accommodation or in hospital) were also entitled to vote in the local elections, although those who had moved abroad and registered as overseas electors cannot vote in the local elections. It is possible to register to vote at more than one address (such as a university student who had a term-time address and lives at home during holidays) at the discretion of the local Electoral Register Office, but it remains an offence to vote more than once in the same local government election.

Ward boundary review
In 2012 the Local Government Boundary Commission for England recommended a number of ward boundary changes, creating a number of new wards and combining others, to improve the electoral equality across the county. As a result, the number of wards increased from 58 to 61, while the number of councillors reduced from 74 to 63. All except two of the wards would now be single member divisions.

Summary

Aftermath

The Conservatives lost the overall majority that they had held on the council for eight years. They were however able to continue to govern in a minority administration with the support of three of the four independent councillors - Lynda Atkins, Mark Gray and Les Sibley. 

The support of these three independent councillors gave the Conservatives an overall majority of 34 out of 63 seats.

Division Results

Abingdon East

Abingdon North

Abingdon South

Banbury Calthorpe

Banbury Grimsbury & Castle

Banbury Hardwick

Banbury Ruscote

Barton, Sandhills & Risinghurst

Benson & Cholsey

Berinsfield & Garsington

Bicester North

Bicester Town

Bicester West

Bloxham & Easington

Burford & Carterton North

Carterton South & West

Chalgrove & Watlington

Charlbury & Wychwood

Chipping Norton

Churchill & Lye Valley

Cowley

Deddington

Didcot East & Hagbourne

Didcot Ladygrove

Didcot West

Eynsham

Faringdon

Goring

Grove & Wantage

Hanborough & Minster Lovell

Headington & Quarry

Hendreds & Harwell

Henley-on-Thames

Iffley Fields & St Mary's

Isis

Jericho & Osney

Kennington & Radley

Kidlington South

Kingston & Cumnor

Kirtlington & Kidlington North

Leys

Marston & Northway

North Hinksey

Otmoor

Ploughley

Rose Hill & Littlemore

Shrivenham

Sonning Common

St Clement's & Cowley Marsh

St Margaret's

Sutton Courtenay & Marcham

Thame & Chinnor

University Parks

Wallingford

Wheatley

Witney North & East

Witney South & Central

Witney West & Bampton

Wolvercote & Summertown

Woodstock

Wroxton & Hook Norton

References

2013 English local elections
2013
2010s in Oxfordshire